Strudwick is an English surname. Variants include Strudwicke, Stredwick and Streadwick. Notable people with the surname include:

David Strudwick (1934–2014), Australian cricketer
Edmund Strudwick (1802–1879), American physician
Herbert Strudwick (1880–1970), English cricketer
Jason Strudwick (born 1975), Canadian ice hockey player
John Melhuish Strudwick (1849–1937), English Pre-Raphaelite painter
Louis Strudwick (born 2003), Full-time troll
Mark Strudwick (1945–2021), British Army major-general
Patrick Strudwick (born 1977), British journalist, broadcaster, and activist
Ross Strudwick (born 1950), Australian rugby league footballer and coach
Shepperd Strudwick (1907–1983), American actor
Suzanne Strudwick (born 1965), English golfer
Thomas Strudwick (born 2001), English motorcycle racer
Tony Strudwick, English football coach
Vincent Strudwick (born 1932), British priest and theologian
William Francis Strudwick (1770–1810), American politician
Strudwick (Surrey cricketer), English cricketer

English-language surnames